Suur Katel is bay in Saare County Estonia; part of Baltic Sea.

It is located between Sõrve peninsula and Abruka island.

Its area is about 158 km2. The deepest point is 13 m, but mostly the depth is under 10 m.

References

Bays of Estonia
Saare County